This is a list of notable hors d'oeuvre, also referred to as appetisers or starters, which may be served either hot or cold. They are food items served before the main courses of a meal, and are also sometimes served at the dinner table as a part of a meal. Many cultures serve dips, such as baba ghanoush, chili con queso, hummus, and tzatziki with bread or vegetables as hors d'oeuvre.

If the period between when guests arrive and when the meal is eaten (for example during a cocktail hour) is extended these might also serve the purpose of sustaining guests during the wait, in the same way that apéritifs are served as a drink before meals. Hors d'oeuvre are sometimes served with no meal afterward; this is the case with many reception and cocktail party events. 


Hors d'oeuvre

See also 

 Amuse-bouche
 Banchan Korean side dishes
 Cicchetti
 Dim sum
 Finger food
 Garnish
 Gujeolpan
 List of dips
 List of pastries
 Picada
 Short Eats
 Preprandial a term sometimes used to refer to hors d'oeuvre
 Smörgåsbord

References

External links
 

Lists of foods by type